"Pain" is a Eurodance song by German band Fun Factory, released in November 1994 as the fourth and last single from their debut-album, NonStop (1994). It peaked at number eight in Finland, number 24 in Germany and number 25 in Austria and Sweden. On the Eurochart Hot 100, it reached number 56 in March 1995. Outside Europe, it peaked at number 30 in Israel. The CD single also featured the music video of the band's previous hit single, "Take Your Chance".

Critical reception
James Hamilton from Music Weeks RM Dance Update described the song as an "instantly familiar cliches packed but powerful cheesy Euro galloper". 

Music video
A music video was produced to promote the single, directed by R.T. Firefly. It was later published on Fun Factory's official YouTube channel in November 2015.

Track listing
 12", Germany 
"Pain" (Feel The Pain Mix) – 4:50
"Pain" (Endless Pain Mix) – 6:54
"Pain" (Sequential One Club Mix) – 5:47
"Fun Factory's Slam" – 3:46

 CD single, France 
"Pain" (Feel The Radio Vocal Mix) – 3:52
"Pain" (Feel The Pain Mix) – 4:50

 CD maxi, Germany, Austria & Switzerland' 
Video: "Take Your Chance" (The Video - Ultramega Multimedia Bonus) – 16:23
"Pain" (Feel The Pain Mix) – 4:50
"Pain" (Feel The Radio Vocal Mix) – 3:52
"Pain" (Sequential One Club Mix) – 5:47
"Fun Factory's Slam" (Instrumental) – 3:47

Charts

References

 

1994 singles
1994 songs
Fun Factory (band) songs
Songs written by Toni Cottura
English-language German songs
Songs written by Bülent Aris